Higgins Pond is a  kettle pond in Brewster, Massachusetts. It is located in Nickerson State Park.

The Massachusetts  Division of Fisheries and Wildlife stocks the pond in spring with various trout species. Access to the pond is difficult for vehicles, but the pond offers anglers good wading.

References

External links
 MassWildlife map and info

Brewster, Massachusetts
Ponds of Barnstable County, Massachusetts
Ponds of Massachusetts